Luigi Niccolò Fadalti (Treviso, 17 October 1988) is an Italian rugby union player.
His usual position is as a Fullback and he currently plays for Mogliano in Top10.

From 2013 he is part of the Italy Sevens squad also to participate at the Qualifying Tournament for the 2020 Summer Olympics and the 2020 World Rugby Sevens Challenger Series.

References

External links 
It's Rugby England Profile
Ultimate Rugby Profile

1988 births
Sportspeople from Treviso
Italian rugby union players
Living people
Rugby union fullbacks